The Critics' Choice Television Award for Best Drama Series is one of the award categories presented annually by the Critics' Choice Television Awards (BTJA).

History
It was introduced in 2011 when the event was first initiated. The winners are selected by a group of television critics that are part of the Broadcast Television Critics Association.

Winners and nominees

2010s

2020s

Total wins by network 

 AMC – 4
 HBO – 4
 FX – 2
 Hulu – 1
 Netflix – 1
 Showtime – 1
 USA – 1

Total nominations by network 

 HBO – 20
 AMC – 11
 Netflix – 10
 FX – 9
 Showtime – 7
 NBC – 6
 CBS – 5
 Apple TV+ – 3
 CBS All Access – 3
 Fox – 3
 Paramount+ – 3
 Disney+ – 2
 PBS – 2
 Amazon Prime Video – 1
 BBC America – 1
 Cinemax – 1
 DirecTV – 1
 Hulu – 1
 Lifetime – 1
 OWN – 1
 Paramount Network – 1
 Starz – 1
 Sundance TV – 1

Multiple wins
2 wins
 The Americans
 Breaking Bad (consecutive)
 Game of Thrones
 Succession

Multiple nominations
8 nominations
 Game of Thrones

5 nominations
 The Crown
 The Good Fight
 The Good Wife
 This Is Us

4 nominations
 The Americans
 Better Call Saul

3 nominations
 Breaking Bad
 Homeland
 Pose
 Succession

2 nominations
 Downton Abbey
 Empire
 Justified
 Mad Men
 Mr. Robot
 Stranger Things

See also
 TCA Award for Outstanding Achievement in Drama
 Primetime Emmy Award for Outstanding Drama Series
 Golden Globe Award for Best Television Series – Drama
 Screen Actors Guild Award for Outstanding Performance by an Ensemble in a Drama Series

References

External links
 

Critics' Choice Television Awards